Peter Michorl (born 9 May 1995) is an Austrian professional footballer who plays as a midfielder for LASK.

External links
 
 

Living people
1995 births
Austrian footballers
Association football midfielders
FK Austria Wien players
LASK players
Footballers from Vienna